Liptak or Lipták is a surname. Notable people with the surname include:

Adam Liptak (born 1960), American journalist, lawyer and instructor in journalism
Attila Lipták, Hungarian sprint canoer
Béla G. Lipták (born 1936), Hungarian Fellow Member of the International Society of Automation and included in the Process Automation Hall of Fame
David Liptak (born 1948), American composer and music teacher
Jiří Lipták (born 1982), Czech trap shooter 
Juraj Lipták, Slovak sprint canoer
Ľubomír Lipták (1930–2003), Slovak historian 
Matthew Liptak (born 1970), retired AFL footballer for the Adelaide Crows
Mattie Liptak (born 1996), American actor
Miroslav Lipták (born1968), retired Slovak cyclist
Pál Lipták (1914–2000), Hungarian anthropologist
Peter Lipták (born 1989), Slovak football player
Vanessa Ray Liptak (born 1981), American actress and singer
Zoltán Lipták (born 1984), Hungarian footballer